Elodie Poo-Cheong (born 20 November 1996) is a Mauritian swimmer. She competed in the women's 100 metre freestyle event at the 2017 World Aquatics Championships. She also competed in four events at the 2018 Commonwealth Games.

References

External links
 

1996 births
Living people
Mauritian female swimmers
Place of birth missing (living people)
Swimmers at the 2014 Summer Youth Olympics
Commonwealth Games competitors for Mauritius
Swimmers at the 2018 Commonwealth Games
Mauritian female freestyle swimmers
Mauritian people of Chinese descent